Tell Meouchi is an archaeological site 2 km southwest of Tell Amara and 3 km south of Ablah in the Beqaa Mohafazat (Governorate). It dates at least to the Early Bronze Age.

References

Baalbek District
Bronze Age sites in Lebanon